WuXi Biologics is a global Contract Research Development and Manufacturing Organization (CRDMO) that provides open-access, integrated technology platforms for biologics drug development.

WuXi Biologics' roots date back to 2010, and began building out capabilities and facilities required for biologics discovery, development and GMP manufacturing. WuXi Biologics went public on the Hong Kong Stock Exchange in June 2017.

As of 2021, WuXi Biologics has 18 manufacturing sites including ten in China, three in the United States, two in Ireland, two in Germany, and one in Singapore.

In August 2020, WuXi Biologics was selected to become a component of the Hang Seng Index in Hong Kong.

Network utilization
As of June 30, 2020, WuXi Biologics has 141 projects in the pre-clinical development stage. In addition, WuXi Biologics also has 125 projects that are currently in early phase clinical trials, 19 in late-phase clinical trials and one project in commercial manufacturing with the goal of increasing this count to eight in 2021.

Facilities in Asia

Shanghai, China
WuXi Biologics has two sites in Shanghai, China.
Waigaoqiao Free Trade Zone
State-of-the-art facility, encompassing 200,000 sq. ft., has been operational since 2018.
Site offers comprehensive, integrated one-stop biologics CMC development and GMP manufacturing services in one central location.
Facility houses 10 European Medicines Agency (EMA)-certified GMP cell banking suites.
Fengxian District
1.6 million sq. ft. global innovation site to be operational in 2021
New state-of-the-art facilities providing discovery, development, analytical development and QC testing and pilot and clinical-scale GMP manufacturing capabilities in one location

Wuxi, China
WuXi Biologics has two sites located in Wu Xi City, China. The Mashan site contains MFG1, MFG2, MFG4 and MFG5. and the Wuxi New Area site contains labs dedicated to the antibody drug conjugate development and production. With 30,000 liters of capacity, MFG2 was the world's largest single-use bioreactor production facility which was replaced in that metric by MFG5 which has a 60,000 liter capacity and opened on February 9, 2021.

Hangzhou, China
As of March 2021, WuXi Biologics will have two sites in Hangzhou China.

On March 17, 2021, WuXi Biologics announced an equity agreement with Pfizer China to acquire its newly built $350 million Hangzhou global biotechnology center site and facilities (MFG20). Also included in the acquisition are vial filling (DP9) and pre-filled syringe (DP10) fill and finish lines. Opened in 2020 and slated to be GMP-ready in 2021, the Hangzhou site (MFG13) is home to facilities dedicated to the development and GMP manufacture of recombinant proteins and plasmid DNA produced via microbial fermentation along with separate facilities for the development and production of a viral-based vaccine.

Suzhou, China
As of March 2021, WuXi Biologics will have two sites located in the city of Suzhou, China.

On March 18, 2021, WuXi Biologics announced a purchase agreement with CBC Group which will allow it to acquire over a 90% interest in CMAB Biopharma Group. The transaction is expected to close in the second quarter of 2021. Along with the controlling stake, WuXi Biologics will also acquire a 7000L bioreactor capacity manufacturing facility (MFG21) in Suzhou and associated liquid and lyophilization (DP21) fill and finish production lines. The facility performs cell line characterization, viral clearance validation studies, and unprocessed bulk lot release.

Chengdu, China

Shijiazhuang, China 

Currently slated to open in 2022, the Shijiazhuang facility MFG8 will be  and dedicated to development and API manufacturing with an initial bioreactor capacity of 48,000 liters.

Singapore 
On May 24, 2018, WuXi Biologics announced it will be building a $60 million facility (MFG10) in Singapore which will feature an initial bioreactor capacity of 4,500 liters made up of two 2,000 liter fed-batch reactors and one 500 liter continuous processing perfusion reactor to open in 2023. The project is backed by the Singapore Economic Development Board and will be dedicated to clinical and small volume commercial production as well as early-stage bioprocess development.

Facilities in Europe

Leverkusen, Germany Facility
On January 17, 2020, WuXi Biologics and Bayer announced an acquisition agreement in which WuXi Biologics would take over the operations and lease a  fill site in Leverkusen, Germany. Based on the agreement, the site would perform the final fill-finish of various biologics products produced by WuXi's API sites, and act as a backup for filling operations for Bayer's Kovaltry anti-hemophilic infusions which are primarily finished in another plant in Berkeley, California.

Wuppertal, Germany Facility 
On December 21, 2020, WuXi Biologics and Bayer announced a new acquisition agreement for a  drug substance (DS) production site for €150 million in Wuppertal, Germany. The DS facility, to be called MFG19, will be capable of continuous bioprocessing in a 3X1000L perfusion bioreactor configuration and 6X2000L in a fed batch traditional bioprocessing configuration. Previously used to produce Bayer's Kovaltry anti-hemophilic infusions, the facility will be reconfigured to incorporate single-use technology and would create 300 jobs in the region.

Dundalk, Ireland Site

Active ingredient production facilities
The project is directly supported by the Irish Government through IDA Ireland, with a cost of approximately $394 million. When completed, the facility will be one of the world's largest plants supporting single-use bioreactors and will help accelerate the development of biologic drugs in Europe. MFG6 will have a perfusion bioreactor capacity of 6,000 liters in a continuous bioprocessing configuration and MFG7 will have a 48,000 liter bioreactor capacity in a traditional fed-batch configuration.

Vaccine production facility

In November 2019, WuXi Vaccines, a subsidiary of WuXi Biologics, announced that it would invest an additional $240 million to build a new  vaccine manufacturing facility at the Dundalk, Ireland site. The vaccine site planned includes drug substance manufacturing facilities, drug product manufacturing, Manufacturing Science and Technology Labs as well as Quality Control labs. In February 2020, WuXi Vaccines announced it had signed a 20-year, $3 billion contract with an unidentified "global vaccine leader" to produce one of the unidentified company's vaccine products at the new facility.

Facilities in the United States

Massachusetts

In May 2020, WuXi Biologics announced that it had secured a deal with the Worcester Business Development Corporation at The Reactory, a master-planned manufacturing hub project in Worcester, Massachusetts. The two-story,  facility will cost $60 million and will employ 150 when it is completed in 2022. The Worcester City Council granted a 20-year, $11.5 million tax increment financing plan to help seal the deal. The new facility will have 16,000 liters of bioreactor capacity, which will include four 4,000-liter traditional fed-batch units and one 500-liter perfusion-based continuous processing unit and will be named MFG11.

New Jersey
In June 2020, WuXi Biologics announced that it had signed a ten-year lease for a  clinical manufacturing facility (MFG18) in Cranbury, NJ.

Pennsylvania
In May 2020, WuXi Biologics announced it had leased a  process development lab in King of Prussia, Pennsylvania at Discovery Labs, a former GlaxoSmithKline manufacturing site.

References

External links
 

Pharmaceutical companies of China